Crepidochares subtigrina is a moth in the family Eriocottidae. It was described by Edward Meyrick in 1922. It is found in Brazil, where it has been recorded only from Amazonas at an area along the Amazon River.

The length of the forewings is about 7.8 mm, wingspan 17 mm.

References

Moths described in 1922
Eriocottidae
Fauna of the Amazon
Moths of South America